His Majestys Dub is a 1983 dub album by King Tubby and Prince Jammy, sometimes credited to Prince Jammy v King Tubbys. It featured Carlton Barrett and Sly Dunbar on drums, Robbie Shakespeare and Aston Barrett on bass guitar, and Ansel Collins on keyboards, among other personnel. The album was produced by Jah Woosh and engineered by King Tubby and Prince Jammy, along with Maxie and frequent collaborator Errol Thompson. The album was recorded at Randy's in Kingston, Jamaica.

The material included dub versions of Bim Sherman's "What Sweet You So", Jah Woosh's "Jah Is the Ruler" and Joseph Earlocks' "Free Up the Blackman".

Like many other dub and reggae records, this album has been (re)released on several different labels with several different covers.

LP track listing 
Track listing taken from Sky Juice SJLP003.

Side one
 "Throne of Judgement"
 "Ruling Power"
 "Lion Heart"
 "His Majesty"
 "King of Kings"

Side two
 "Thunder Shock"
 "Ethiopia Rock"
 "King Tubby's Salute"
 "Jah Works"

Personnel 
Aston "Family Man" Barrett – bass guitar
Robbie Shakespeare – bass guitar
Errol "Flabba" Holt - bass guitar
Carlton Barrett – drums
Sly Dunbar – drums
Style Scott - drums
Radcliffe "Dougie" Bryan - lead guitar 
Winston "Boo Pee" Bowen - lead guitar
Eric "Bingy Bunny" Lamont - rhythm guitar
Noel "Sowell" Bailey - rhythm guitar
Ansel Collins - keyboards
Theophilus "Snapping" Beckford - keyboards
Gladstone "Gladdy" Anderson - keyboards
Bobby Ellis - trumpet
Vin Gordon - trombone
Bongo Herman - percussion
Noel "Scully" Simms - percussion
Technical
King Tubby - engineer
Prince Jammy - engineer
Errol Thompson - engineer
Lancelot "Maxie" McKenzie - engineer
Sharron Lea - cover design
Remixed at King Tubby's Studio, Kingston, Jamaica
"Special thanks to the singers and players who helped to make this album possible. Special request to the Secta Posse"

1983 albums
Dub albums